The 1992 NCAA Division I baseball season, play of college baseball in the United States organized by the National Collegiate Athletic Association (NCAA) began in the spring of 1992.  The season progressed through the regular season and concluded with the 1992 College World Series.  The College World Series, held for the forty sixth time in 1992, consisted of one team from each of eight regional competitions and was held in Omaha, Nebraska, at Johnny Rosenblatt Stadium as a double-elimination tournament.  Pepperdine claimed the championship for the first time.

Realignment
Florida State and South Carolina departed the Metro Conference for the Atlantic Coast Conference and the Southeastern Conference, respectively.
Arkansas left the Southwest Conference for the Southeastern Conference.
Georgia Southern and Arkansas–Little Rock moved from the Trans America Athletic Conference (TAAC) to the Southern Conference and the Sun Belt Conference, respectively.
Old Dominion left the Sun Belt Conference and joined the Colonial Athletic Association.
College of Charleston and Southeastern Louisiana joined the TAAC after reclassifying to NCAA Division I.  Meanwhile, Georgia State restarted its program in the TAAC after 5 seasons without varsity baseball.
Wright State and Youngstown State joined the Mid-Continent Conference, leaving the ranks of independents.
Northern Iowa departed the Mid-Continent Conference for the Missouri Valley Conference.

Format changes
With the addition of two new teams, the SEC split into Eastern and Western divisions.

Conference winners
This is a partial list of conference champions from the 1992 season.  The NCAA sponsored regional competitions to determine the College World Series participants.  Each of the eight regionals consisted of six teams competing in double-elimination tournaments, with the winners advancing to Omaha.  24 teams earned automatic bids by winning their conference championship while 24 teams earned at-large selections.

Conference standings
The following is an incomplete list of conference standings:

College World Series

The 1992 season marked the forty sixth NCAA Baseball Tournament, which culminated with the eight team College World Series.  The College World Series was held in Omaha, Nebraska.  The eight teams played a double-elimination format, with Pepperdine claiming their first championship with a 3–2 win over Cal State Fullerton in the final.

Award winners

All-America team

References